Modern Syriac or Neo-Syriac may refer to:

 Modern Syriac languages or Neo-Syriac languages, variant terms for Neo-Aramaic languages, in general
 Modern Syriac literature or Neo-Syriac literature, variant terms for modern forms of Syriac literature
 Modern Syriac identity or Neo-Syriac identity, variant terms for various forms of modern Syriac identity

See also
 Syriac (disambiguation)
 Syrian (disambiguation)